Fredrik Adam Smitt, (9 May 1839 in Halmstad – 19 February 1904 in Stockholm), was a Swedish zoologist.

Biography 
Smitt studied in Lund and Uppsala where he received his doctorate in 1863. In 1861 and 1868 He participated in the Swedish expeditions to Svalbard. In 1871 he was appointed professor at the Swedish Museum of Natural History, where he was in charge of the Department of Vertebrates. From 1879 he also taught zoology at Stockholm University.

Smitt produced both popular works and many scientific papers. Besides his scientific work, Smitt also championed the modernization of the techniques herring fisheries.

Taxon described by him
See :Category:Taxa named by Fredrik Adam Smitt

Selected works 
Ur högre djurens utvecklingshistoria (1876)
Ryggradsdjurens geologiska utveckling och slägtskapsförhållanden (1882)
Kritisk förteckning öfver i Riksmuseum befintliga salmonider (1886)
Skandinaviens fiskar, revised edition (1892)
A history of Scandinavian fishes (1892)

References

External links

Swedish ichthyologists
19th-century Swedish zoologists
1839 births
1904 deaths
Academic staff of Stockholm University